Andriy Khomyn may refer to:
Andriy Khomyn (footballer born 1982), Ukrainian footballer
Andriy Khomyn (footballer born 1968), Ukrainian footballer